Silver Skies is the fourth studio album by Australian country music singer Sara Storer. It was released in November 2007 and peaked at number 60 on the ARIA Charts.

At the ARIA Music Awards of 2008, the album was nominated for ARIA Award for Best Country Album, losing to Rattlin' Bones by Kasey Chambers and Shane Nicholson .

Track listing
 "Sitting Here with Fay" – 3:53
 "Land Cries Out" – 3:54
 "Cold River" – 3:21
 "Silver Skies" – 4:32
 "Long Live the Girls" – 3:42
 "Second Time Around" – 2:46
 "Lovely Valentine" – 4:12
 "Crow" – 2:16
 "Forgive" – 3:29
 "Back in the Territory" – 2:38
 "Twenty Three" – 3:30
 "Tumbleweeds" – 4:52

Charts

Weekly charts

Year-end charts

References

2007 albums
Sara Storer albums